Gilbert Thomas Burnett (15 April 1800 – 27 July 1835) was a British botanist.

Burnett was the first professor of botany at King's College London, from 1831 to 1835. He was the author of Outlines of Botany (1835), and Illustrations of Useful Plants employed in the Arts and Medicine, published posthumously and illustrated by his sister Mary Ann Burnett. 

Burnett also wrote articles on zoology, such as Illustrations of the Manupeda or apes and their allies (1828).

Publications 
 Outlines of Botany. 1835
  Plantæ utiliores : or Illustrations of Useful Plants employed in the Arts & Medicine
 Illustrations of the Manupeda or apes and their allies. 1828

 
An Encyclopædia of Useful and Ornamental Plants

References 
Burnett, Gilbert Thomas (1800–1835), surgeon and botanist by A. M. Lucas in Dictionary of National Biography

External links 
 

British botanists
1800 births
1835 deaths
Academics of King's College London
Fellows of the Linnean Society of London
Place of birth missing